Santi Promphat (born January 1, 1952) is a Thai politician who served as deputy minister of Finance in Prime Minister Prayut Chan-o-cha government.

Education
Santi graduated with a Bachelor of Arts (Political Science) from Ramkhamhaeng University in 2002 and a Master of Arts (Political Science) from Ramkhamhaeng University in 2004 and passed the Senior Executive Judicial Training Program (Class 11) in 2006–2007.

Political careers
In 2012 he served as Minister of Social Development and Human Security in Yingluck Shinawatra cabinet, in the same year he attended the Coordinated Mekong Ministerial Initiative Against Trafficking meeting in Hanoi, Vietnam. On March 15, 2012, he was accused of slender by secretary of Human Development, Panita Kambhu na Ayutthaya. In 2013 he addressed greetings with Visakha Puja Day. On January 17, 2014, he inspected human rights abuses at fishing industries after discovering that his country was placed on a black list by the Tier 2 Watch company for three years straight. On March 1, 2013, he, Minister of Labor Phadermchai Sasomsub, and Police General Adul Saengsingkaew have participated in a discussion on combating human trafficking which was hosted by Surapong Tovichakchaikul. From May 15 to May 16 of 2013 he participated at a meeting which was hosted by the Royal Thai Government in cooperation with Asia-Pacific Development Center on Disability and World Bank to promote rights for disabled individuals in Thailand.

In 2018, Santi moved to Palang Pracharath Party to form a government with Prime Minister Prayut Chan-o-cha.

References

Living people
20th-century births
Year of birth missing (living people)
Santi Promphat
Santi Promphat
Santi Promphat